Nicolás Diego Dematei (born 19 November 1987) is an Argentine professional footballer who plays as a left-back for Club Almagro.

Career
Ateneo de la Juventud, Flandria and Sarmiento were Dematei's opening youth teams, prior to joining Argentinos Juniors. He was loaned to Atlético Tucumán in 2008, they selected him twenty times in the 2008–09 Primera B Nacional as they won promotion as champions. Dematei had stints with Sarmiento and Defensa y Justicia. After appearing twice for Florencio Varela team, he returned to Sarmiento on 30 June 2011. They won the 2011–12 Primera B Metropolitana title in his first season, which gave promotion to the second tier. He stayed for 2012–13, scoring his first Sarmiento goal against Aldosivi in the process.

Dematei switched clubs to Instituto on 30 June 2014. One goal and nineteen matches followed. Crucero del Norte signed Dematei ahead of the 2014 Primera B Nacional campaign, a competition that won them a place in the 2015 Primera División where the defender participated twenty-two times and netted versus Quilmes; though it ended with relegation down a division. Subsequent moves to Guillermo Brown and Atlético de Rafaela then came between 2016 and 2018. In the latter year, on 8 August, Dematei joined Independiente Rivadavia.

Career statistics
.

Honours
Atlético Tucumán
Primera B Nacional: 2008–09

Sarmiento
Primera B Metropolitana: 2011–12

References

External links

1987 births
Living people
People from Mercedes, Buenos Aires
Argentine footballers
Association football fullbacks
Primera Nacional players
Primera B Metropolitana players
Argentine Primera División players
Argentinos Juniors footballers
Atlético Tucumán footballers
Club Atlético Sarmiento footballers
Defensa y Justicia footballers
Instituto footballers
Crucero del Norte footballers
Guillermo Brown footballers
Atlético de Rafaela footballers
Independiente Rivadavia footballers
Club Agropecuario Argentino players
Club Almagro players
Sportspeople from Buenos Aires Province